Inchy-en-Artois (literally "Inchy in Artois") is a commune in the Pas-de-Calais department in the Hauts-de-France region of France.

Geography

Population

Places of interest
 The church of St.Martin, rebuilt along with all of the village, after the First World War.
 The Commonwealth War Graves Commission cemetery.

See also
Communes of the Pas-de-Calais department

References

External links

 Triangle cemetery at Inchy

Incyenartois